The Women's road race of the 2019 UCI Road World Championships was a cycling event that took place on 28 September 2019 in Yorkshire, England. It started in Bradford and finished in Harrogate, after three laps in Harrogate.

Defending champion Anna van der Breggen, also of the Netherlands, finished as runner-up, with Australian cyclist Amanda Spratt finishing in third.

Qualification

Participating nations
152 cyclists from 49 nations were entered in the women's road race, however Luxembourg's Anne-Sophie Harsch did not start the event. The number of cyclists per nation is shown in parentheses.

Final classification

References

External links
Road race page at the Yorkshire 2019 website 

Women's road race
UCI Road World Championships – Women's road race
2019 in women's road cycling